Pineapple Colony is a neighborhood situated on the western part of Visakhapatnam City, India. The area, which falls under the local administrative limits of Greater Visakhapatnam Municipal Corporation, is lay down  Simhachalam Hill Range . the originate of this colony people are pineapple farmers and government allotted lands to these farmers in 1970.

References

Neighbourhoods in Visakhapatnam